Jan Linsen (Hoorn, 1602 or 1603 – Hoorn, May 26, 1635) was a Dutch painter of mythological and historical themes.

Jan Linsen travelled in France and Italy on a Grand Tour, and in Rome he became a member of the painters' circle known as the Bentvueghels, with the nickname Hermafrodito. While on a ship bound homewards from Italy, he was captured by Moorish pirates. He was ransomed for 20 pieces of silver, which was paid by his company. He later painted a scene of this encounter that still hung in Hoorn when Arnold Houbraken was writing. He died young, according to Houbraken, due to an argument in a bar, where he was stabbed to death by a man whom he claimed to have loved and forgave before he died of the wound.

References 
 Jan Linsen biography in De groote schouburgh der Nederlantsche konstschilders en schilderessen (1718) by Arnold Houbraken, courtesy of the Digital library for Dutch literature

External links
 recently auctioned works by Jan Linsen

1600s births
1635 deaths
Dutch Golden Age painters
Dutch male painters
People from Hoorn
Members of the Bentvueghels